Lowell Lee Andrews (September 21, 1940 – November 30, 1962) was a University of Kansas sophomore convicted of the murders of his parents and his sister on November 28, 1958, a crime for which he was later executed.

Background
Andrews, a zoology major who played bassoon in the college band, was described by his hometown newspaper as "The Nicest Boy in Wolcott". In reality, the 18-year-old entertained fantasies of poisoning his family and moving to Chicago, Illinois to become a gangster and professional hitman.

Andrews and his sister, Jennie Marie, were both home for the Thanksgiving holiday in 1958. Jennie Marie was watching television with her parents while Andrews was upstairs reading The Brothers Karamazov. When he finished reading the novel, Andrews shaved, put on a suit, and went downstairs carrying a .22 caliber rifle and a revolver. Walking into the room where his parents and sister were, Andrews turned on a light and opened fire with his rifle. He shot his sister, Jennie Marie, 20, between the eyes. He then turned the gun on his parents, shooting his father, William, 50, twice and mother, Opal, 42, three times. His mother moved towards him and he shot her another three times. His father attempted to crawl to the kitchen and was shot repeatedly with the revolver. Andrews fired a total of 17 shots into his father.

After opening a window in an attempt to make the crime look like a burglary, Andrews left the house and drove to the nearby town of Lawrence. He drove to his apartment to establish an alibi, claiming that he had needed to pick up his typewriter to write an essay and then went to the Granada movie theater, where he watched Mardi Gras (1958), starring Pat Boone. When the film ended, he drove to the Kansas River, dismantled the weapons and threw them off the Massachusetts Street Bridge. He returned home and called the police to inform them of a robbery at his parents' house.

When police arrived, they noticed that Andrews seemed unconcerned over the massacre of his family. He protested his innocence until the family's minister, Pastor Vertio C. Dameron of Grandview Baptist Church in Kansas City, Kansas, was able to persuade him to confess. Lowell eventually confessed that he had committed the murder, stating "I'm not sorry and I'm not glad I did it. I just don't know why I did it, I didn't even feel anything as they died."

Conviction and execution 

Andrews pleaded not guilty by reason of insanity but was convicted and sentenced to death. His request for clemency from Kansas Governor John Anderson, Jr. was denied.  Despite further appeals, the U.S. Supreme Court let the conviction stand and the State of Kansas executed Andrews by hanging on November 30, 1962 at the age of 22. His last meal was two fried chickens with sides of mashed potatoes, green beans and pie à la mode. He gave no last words.

Andrews was on death row at the Lansing Correctional Facility at the same time as Richard Hickock and Perry Smith, murderers of the Clutter family and the subjects of Truman Capote's 1965 book In Cold Blood. Several pages in Capote's book concern Andrews, who was portrayed by C. Ernst Harth in the film Capote and Ray Gestaut in the film Infamous the following year. He was portrayed by Bowman Upchurch in the original film adaptation of In Cold Blood.

See also 
 Familicide
 Capital punishment in Kansas
 List of people executed in Kansas

References

1940 births
1962 deaths
1958 murders in the United States
People from Wyandotte County, Kansas
Familicides
American people executed for murder
People convicted of murder by Kansas
People executed by Kansas by hanging
Executed people from Kansas
20th-century executions by Kansas
Criminals from Kansas
20th-century executions of American people